Krośnice may refer to the following places in Poland:
Krośnice, Lower Silesian Voivodeship (south-west Poland)
Krośnice, Masovian Voivodeship (east-central Poland)